Ruwanwella fort ( Ruwanwælla Balakotuwa), was initially a fortified base camp erected by the Portuguese in 1590s at Ruwanwella, Kegalle. It was captured by Dutch in 1665, who constructed a wooden fort (Ruanelle) but abandoned it within a few years. In 1817 the British built a stone fort on the site with two bastions.

Ruwanwella fort is currently being used as a police station.

References

Further reading

External links 
 Ruwanwella 

British forts in Sri Lanka
Dutch forts in Sri Lanka
Forts in Sabaragamuwa Province
Buildings and structures in Kegalle District
Portuguese forts in Sri Lanka